Arle is a place name which may refer to:

 Arle, Cheltenham, a district of Gloucestershire, England 
 Arle Grove, a nature reserve in Gloucestershire, England
 River Arle, alternative name for the River Alre, Hampshire, England
 Arle, Occitan-language name for Arles, France
 Arle, a district Großheide, Frisia, Lower Saxony, Germany

Arle may also refer to -
 Arle Nadja, a character from Puyo Puyo